Terry Kellar (born as Roy Walter Keller on March 7, 1890) was a pro boxer who won the lightweight, welterweight and middleweight championships.

Professional boxing record

Footnotes

1890 births
1950 deaths
Boxers from Nebraska
American male boxers